Oreo (stylized as OREO) is a brand of sandwich cookie consisting of two biscuits or cookie pieces with a sweet creme filling. It was introduced by Nabisco on March 6, 1912, and through a series of corporate acquisitions, mergers and splits both Nabisco and the Oreo brand have been owned by Mondelez International since 2012. Oreo cookies are available in over one hundred countries. Many varieties of Oreo cookies have been produced, and limited-edition runs have become popular in the 21st century.

While Oreo is actually an imitation of the Hydrox chocolate cream-centered cookie introduced in 1908, Oreos far outstripped Hydrox in popularity, so much so that many think Hydrox is an imitation of Oreo rather than the other way around. Oreo is the best-selling cookie brand in the United States and, the best-selling cookie globally.

Etymology 
The origin of the name "Oreo" is unknown, but there are many hypotheses, including derivations from the French word or, meaning "gold", or from the Greek word  meaning "nice" or "attractive". Others believe that the cookie was named Oreo simply because the name was short and easy to pronounce. Another theory, proposed by the food writer Stella Parks, is that the name derives from the Latin Oreodaphne, a genus of the laurel family. She observes that the original design of the Oreo includes a laurel wreath, and the names of several of Nabisco's cookies at the time of the original Oreo had botanical derivations, including Avena, Lotus, and Helicon (from Heliconia).

History

20th century 

The "Oreo Biscuit" was first developed and produced by the National Biscuit Company (today known as Nabisco) in 1912 at its Chelsea, New York City factory in the present-day Chelsea Market complex, located on Ninth Avenue between 15th and 16th Streets. Today, this same block of Ninth Avenue is known as "Oreo Way". The name Oreo was trademarked on March 14, 1912. It was launched as an imitation of the original Hydrox cookie manufactured by Sunshine company, which was introduced in 1908.

The original design on the face of the Oreo featured a wreath around the edge of the cookie and the name "OREO" in the center. In the United States, they were sold for  a pound (454 g) in novelty metal canisters with clear glass tops. The first Oreo was sold on March 6, 1912, to a grocer in Hoboken, New Jersey.

The Oreo Biscuit was renamed in 1921 to "Oreo Sandwich"; in 1948, the name was changed to "Oreo Crème Sandwich"; and in 1974 it became the "Oreo Chocolate Sandwich Cookie", the name that has remained to this day. A new design for the face of the cookie was launched in 1924; the modern-day Oreo design was developed in 1952 by William A. Turnier, incorporating the Nabisco logo. In 1920, a second lemon crème-filled variety of the Oreo was introduced, as an alternative to the white crème-filled variety, but this was discontinued in 1924 and the original flavor was the only version available for the next several decades.

The modern Oreo cookie filling was developed by Nabisco's principal food scientist, Sam Porcello, who retired from Nabisco in 1993. Porcello held five patents directly related to his work on the Oreo; he also created a range of Oreo cookies that were covered in dark chocolate and white chocolate. In the early 1990s, health concerns prompted Nabisco to replace the lard in the crème filling with partially hydrogenated vegetable oil. Oreo cookies are popular with people that have certain dietary restrictions, such as vegans, as the crème filling does not use any animal products. However, there is still a risk of cross-contamination from other dairy-containing products made in the same production areas. In the FAQ section of the Oreo.co.uk website, on the question of whether Oreo cookies are suitable for vegans, their response is "No, OREO have milk as cross contact and therefore they are not suitable for vegans."

21st century 

In January 2006, Nabisco replaced the trans fat in the Oreo cookie with non-hydrogenated vegetable oil.

In June 2012, Oreo posted an advertisement displaying an Oreo cookie with rainbow-colored crème to celebrate LGBT Pride month; the cookie itself was fictional and was not being manufactured or made available for sale. The advertisement prompted some negative comments from conservatives, but Kraft stood by their promotion, stating that "Kraft Foods has a proud history of celebrating diversity and inclusiveness. We feel the Oreo ad is a fun reflection of our values." This was followed during 2012 by a series of adverts commemorating other holidays and events, including a blue, white, and red crème Oreo to honor Bastille Day, a stream of cookie crumbs marking the appearance of the Delta Aquariids meteor shower, and a cookie with a jagged bite taken out of it to promote Shark Week on Discovery Channel.

When the power went out during Super Bowl XLVII in 2013, the Oreo marketing team tweeted "you can still dunk in the dark" from its social media command center; this was retweeted almost 15,000 times and increased Oreo's count of Twitter, Facebook, and Instagram followers. One commentator remarked that this "solidified the viability and necessity of real-time marketing".

According to an April 2022 research report published in the journal Physics of Fluids, it was proven impossible to split the cream filling of an Oreo cookie down the middle. The cream always adheres to one side of the wafer, no matter how quickly the cookie is twisted.

International distribution 
Oreo cookies are distributed worldwide through a variety of sales and marketing channels. As their popularity continues to grow, so too does the amount of distribution that comes with it. According to the Kraft Foods company, the Oreo is the "World's Best Selling Cookie". In March 2012, Time magazine reported that Oreo cookies were available in more than 100 countries. Overall, it is estimated that since the Oreo cookie's inception in 1912, over 450 billion Oreos have been produced worldwide.

Oreos were first introduced into Britain through the supermarket chain Sainsbury's. For several years, this was the only supermarket chain in the UK to stock the Oreo until May 2008, when Kraft decided to fully launch the Oreo across the whole of the UK. Its packaging was redesigned into the more familiar British tube design, accompanied by a £4.5M television advertising campaign based around the "twist, lick, dunk" catchphrase. In a 2020 national poll the Oreo was ranked the 16th most popular biscuit in the UK, with McVitie's chocolate digestive topping the list.

In the UK, Kraft partnered with McDonald's to introduce the Oreo McFlurry (which was already on sale in several other countries, including the US) into McDonald's locations across the country during its annual Great Tastes of America promotions; in October 2015, the Oreo McFlurry then became a permanent menu item at McDonald's in the UK. An Oreo-flavored "Krushem" drink was also on sale in KFC stores across Britain.

The ingredients of the British Oreo (as listed on the UK Oreo website) are slightly different from those of the US Oreo. Unlike the US version, the British Oreo originally contained whey powder, which was not suitable for people with lactose intolerance. Additionally, as the whey powder was sourced from cheese made with calf rennet, the British version was also unsuitable for vegetarians. On December 6, 2011, Kraft announced that production of Oreo was to start in the UK with their Cadbury Trebor Bassett factory in Sheffield, South Yorkshire, being selected to manufacture Oreo in Britain for the first time. Production began there in May 2013.

Oreo cookies were introduced onto the Indian market by Cadbury India in 2011. In Pakistan, Oreo is manufactured and sold by Continental Biscuits Limited under the LU brand. In Japan, Oreo and other Nabisco products were produced by Yamazaki Baking until Mondelez terminated their licensing deal in favor of moving production to China. A year later, Yamazaki introduced their version of Oreo called "Noir", which is produced at the former Oreo factory in Ibaraki Prefecture.

Production 

Most of the Oreo production was once carried out at the Hershey's factory in Hershey, Pennsylvania. By 2017, more than 40 billion Oreo cookies were being produced annually in 18 countries around the world. Oreo cookies for the Asian markets are manufactured in India, Indonesia, Bahrain, and China. Oreo cookies for the European market are made in Spain and at the Cadbury factory in the UK; they are made in Russia (Mondelēz Rus) for consumers in several CIS countries; and those sold in Australia are manufactured in Indonesia, China or Bahrain, depending on the flavor. The version produced in Canada (sold under the Christie's brand) included coconut oil but as of 2023, the ingredient list included vegetable oil and modified palm oil, similar to the American cookies. Manufacture of Oreo biscuits began in Pakistan in early 2014, in collaboration with Mondelez International of the United States and Continental Biscuits Limited (CBL) of Pakistan, at the CBL production plant in Sukkur.

Oreo boycott 

In 2015, Mondelez announced its decision to close some of its American factories and move production to Mexico, prompting the Oreo boycott. In 2016, after production had started in Mexico, the AFL–CIO encouraged the boycott and published consumer guidance to help identify which Mondelez products were made in Mexico.

In July 2016, Oreo cookies ceased production in Chicago.

Ingredients 
The ingredients of Oreo cookies have remained largely unchanged from the original, although numerous alternative varieties and flavors have emerged over time. Oreo cookies were made with lard until the mid-1990s, when Nabisco swapped the animal fat with partially hydrogenated vegetable oil due to growing health concerns. The classic Oreo cookie is made using eleven main ingredients:

 Sugar
 Unbleached enriched flour (wheat flour, niacin, iron, thiamine mono-nitrate (vitamin B1), riboflavin (vitamin B2), folic acid)
 High oleic canola oil or palm oil
 Cocoa (treated with alkali)
 High-fructose corn syrup
 Leavening agent (baking soda or monocalcium phosphate)
 Corn starch
 Salt
 Soy lecithin
 Vanillin
 Chocolate

Nutrition 
One six-pack of Oreos contains 270 calories, hence there are 45 calories in one cookie. Of these 45 calories, 27 come from carbohydrates, 16.5 come from fat, and 1.5 calories are provided by protein.

Different Oreo flavors have varying amounts of carbohydrate: the chocolate fudge Oreo contains 13g of total carbohydrates (4% of the recommended daily intake) and 9g of sugars per serving of 3 cookies, while mint Oreos contain 25g of total carbohydrates and 18g of sugars per serving. Oreos contain small amounts of proteins and minerals (iron and sodium are present) but they do not contain any vitamins.

Varieties 

In addition to their traditional design of two chocolate wafers separated by a crème filling, Oreo cookies have been produced in a multitude of different varieties since they were first introduced. This list is only a guide to some of the more notable and popular types; not all are available in every country. The main varieties in the United States are:
 Double Stuf Oreo – Introduced in 1974, this variety has about double the normal amount of crème filling as the original. (A math teacher found that Doubled Stuf Oreos only had 1.86 times the amount of cream of normal Oreos.) Available with various flavors of crème filling: original, chocolate, peanut butter, cool mint, and birthday cake. In the UK these are called Double Creme Oreos and are only available in original flavor. The Golden Double Stuf Oreo, featuring golden Oreo wafers with a double portion of original vanilla-flavored crème, was introduced in 2009.
 Football Oreo – (American/Canadian) Football-shaped Oreo cookies, introduced in 1976.
 Big Stuf Oreo – A short-lived variety of the Oreo cookie, introduced in 1987 but discontinued in 1991, these were several times the size of a normal Oreo. Sold individually, each Big Stuf contained  and 13 grams of fat.
 Golden Oreo – First released in 2004, this has "golden" vanilla-flavored wafers on the outside of the cookie, as an alternative to the original chocolate-flavored wafers. Available with various flavors of crème filling including original, chocolate, lemon and birthday cake. The chocolate crème variety, being the reverse of the original cookie, was known as the Uh-Oh Oreo until 2007.
 Oreo Mini – First introduced in 1991, these are miniature bite-sized versions of the original Oreo cookie. After being discontinued in the late 1990s, they were re-released in 2000 along with the redesigned 2001 Dodge Caravan minivan as part of a promotional tie-in with Daimler AG. Their packaging in the 1990s consisted of a "miniaturized" version of the full-sized cardboard tray and box used in Oreo packaging at the time. Their revised packaging consists of an aluminum foil bag. Oreo Minis are available with various flavors of crème filling including original, chocolate, strawberry, and the new mint flavor which debuted in 2015. As well as the bagged version, they are also sold in Nabisco To-Go Cups, lidded plastic cups which fit into car cup-holders (in line with other Nabisco snacks that come in miniature form, such as Nutter Butters). A Golden Oreo Mini was also made available after the Golden Oreo was released in 2004. According to the Oreo website, the slogan of the Oreo Mini is "Grab 'em. Pop 'em. Love 'em."
 Oreo Cakesters: Introduced in 2007, Oreo Cakesters are Oreo's version of a whoopie pie, soft chocolate snack cakes with vanilla, chocolate or peanut butter creme in the middle. They were discontinued in 2012. In 2021, a TikTok creator named Stefan Jonson started a movement to have them brought back. The same year, Nabisco announced that Cakesters would be making a return in 2022, including Oreo and Nutter Butter varieties.
 Mega Stuf Oreo – Released in February 2013, the Mega Stuf variety is similar to Double Stuf, but with even more white crème filling. They come in both chocolate and golden wafer varieties.
 Oreo Thins – Introduced in July 2015, this is a thin version of the original Oreo cookie. Thins come in both chocolate and golden wafer varieties, with various crème filling flavors including chocolate, mint, lemon and tiramisu. Each cookie contains only 40 calories; they are 66% thinner than the original version.
 Chocolate Oreo – Simply an Oreo cookie with chocolate crème filling instead of the original vanilla-flavored white crème filling.
 Mint Oreo – A variety of Oreo with two chocolate wafers separated by a mint-flavored crème filling.
 The Most Stuf – Introduced in January 2019, an initially limited edition Oreo with approximately four times the amount of crème filling of a standard Oreo. After two limited runs, it was quietly brought back as a permanent product in the Fall of 2020. While they were first offered in traditional Oreo packages and widely available when they were limited edition, the permanent version is only found in individual four-packs as well as 12 four-pack collections within convenience store settings.
 Gluten Free – Introduced in January 2021, comes in both traditional and Double Stuf varieties
 Birthday Cake

Special edition Double Stuf Oreo cookies are produced during springtime, and around Halloween and Christmas. These have colored frosting reflecting the current holiday: blue or yellow for springtime; orange for Halloween; and red or green for the Christmas holiday. One side of each seasonal cookie is stamped with an appropriate design; the spring cookies feature flowers, butterflies, etc., while the Halloween editions feature a jack o'lantern, ghost, cat, flock of bats, or broom-riding witch. The 2017 Halloween Oreo broke with this tradition, having orange-colored crème filling (albeit with classic vanilla flavor) but carrying no seasonal designs.

In some countries, Oreos come in a variety of flavors that are not familiar to the U.S. market. For example, Green Tea Oreos are only available in China and Japan, while Lemon Ice Oreos were only ever introduced in Japan or Blueberry Ice Cream available in China, Indonesia, Malaysia, Singapore, Thailand and Vietnam. Additionally, there are alfajor Oreo cookies available in Argentina, composed of three Oreo cookies with vanilla filling between each, and covered in chocolate.

Limited editions 

Beginning in the early 2010s, Nabisco began releasing limited edition runs of cookies with more exotic flavors. These "limited editions" typically appear in stores for a short period and are then discontinued, although some varieties have since resurfaced, for example: Reese's Oreos returned for a second limited run after they were first introduced for a limited period in 2014; and Birthday Cake Oreos, originally introduced in 2012, have since become permanently available. Some limited editions are only made available at certain retailers.

Limited-edition runs usually feature a crème filling that has been flavored to replicate the taste of a specific fruit or dessert, from familiar flavors such as lemon or mint, to the more specific and unusual flavors of blueberry pie or red velvet cake. They may also incorporate different varieties of cookie wafer, for example Cinnamon-Bun Oreos featured cinnamon-flavored cookies and "frosting-flavored crème". In recent years, some limited editions have paired Oreos with other recognizable confectionery brands, including Reese's, Swedish Fish, and Peeps.

Oreo's six-person team in charge of special flavors is extremely secretive; the company will not disclose even the group's name. The limited-edition flavors largely serve as advertising for Oreo's regular varieties. Oreo cookies was mentioned as one of the strong brands - such as behind family-oriented companies in Forbes.

Use of "oreo" as a slur
Oreo cookies, due to their almost-black cookies and white filling, have often been used in popular culture as a metaphor for relations between people of color and white people.

Applied to a single person 
The term "Oreo" has occasionally been used as a racial slur aimed at a person of mixed-race or African-American heritage who is accused of trying to act white. The insult may be levied as an accusation that the person perpetuates the "un-level playing field for blacks", and is based on the implication that the person is like the cookie, "black on the outside and white on the inside". For example, the protagonist of the 1974 novel, Oreo, was nicknamed Oreo because of a mixed Jewish-American and African-American heritage. Former American president Barack Obama, due to his biracial heritage, has been compared to an Oreo by political pundits and television personalities such as John McLaughlin and Rush Limbaugh.

In 2021, the chair of the Lamar County Democrats, Gary O'Connor, compared South Carolina Senator Tim Scott, the only African-American Republican in the United States Senate, to an Oreo after Scott gave the Republican response to Joe Biden's joint address to Congress. Amid fierce criticism, O'Connor apologized for his remarks and offered his resignation, but the Lamar County Democrats chose not to accept his resignation and O'Connor wrote a public letter of apology for his remarks.

Applied to three people 
In the 1976 movie, A Star Is Born, Barbra Streisand's character Esther Hoffman is the white central member of The Oreos, a three-girl singing group, between black actresses Venetta Fields and Clydie King.

See also 

 Cookies and cream
 Newman-O's
 Hydrox
 Domino (cookie)

Explanatory notes

Citations

Further reading

External links 

 
 Additional history notes on Oreo cookies

 
Cookie sandwiches
Mondelez International brands
Nabisco brands
Products introduced in 1912